Veselí is name of several locations in the Czech Republic:

 Veselí nad Lužnicí, a town in Tábor District 
 Veselí nad Moravou, a town in Hodonín District
 Veselí (Pardubice District), a village in Pardubice District
 Vysoké Veselí, a town in Jičín District

See also
Veselý, a surname
Veselá (disambiguation)
Veselé (disambiguation)